The 2012–13 Moldovan Cup is the 22nd season of the Moldovan annual football tournament. The competition began on 25 August 2012 with the First Preliminary Round and will end with the final held in May 2012. The winner of the competition will qualify for the first qualifying round of the 2012–13 UEFA Europa League.

First Preliminary Round
Entering this round are 30 clubs from the Moldovan "B" Division. These matches took place on 14 September 2011.

|}

Second Preliminary Round
The 13 winners from the previous round and 1 club from the Moldovan "B" Division entered this stage of the competition. These matches took place on 1 September 2012.

|}

First round
In this round enter teams from "A" Division. They will play against 8 winner teams from the second preliminary round. These matches took place on 8 September 2012.

|}

Second round
In this round enter 4 teams from National Division. These matches were played on 26 September 2012.

|}

Third round
In this round entered the five winners from the previous round, the three winners from first round and the remaining eight teams from the National Division. These matches were played on 31 October 2012.

Quarter-finals
This round featured the eight winners from the previous round. The matches were played on 16–17 April 2013.

Semi-finals
This round featured the four winners from the previous round. The matches were played on 7 May 2013.

Final
The match was scheduled to be played at 27 May 2013.

Top goalscorers
Updated to matches played on 26 May 2013.

Hat-tricks

Moldova vs Rest of World

TOP Foreign's

References

Moldovan Cup seasons
Moldovan Cup 2012-13
Moldova